Sir Henry Oxenden, 3rd Baronet (1645–1709), was the English deputy-governor of Bombay of East India Company. He assumed the office on 30 June 1677 and left office on 27 October 1681.

He was present at the coronation ceremony of Chhatrapati Shivaji Maharaj on 6 June 1674 at Raigad Fort.

He was the second son of the M.P. of Sandwich Sir Henry Oxenden, 1st Baronet, and his second wife Elizabeth Meredith, and the nephew of Sir George Oxenden.

He was Colonel of a regiment of the Kent Militia in 1697.

References

 

1645 births
1709 deaths
Deputy Governors of Bombay
Baronets in the Baronetage of England
Kent Militia officers